Ronald Romero (born 20 November 1981) is a Chilean singer and lyricist best known as the lead vocalist of the rock bands Lords of Black, Rainbow, The Ferrymen, Michael Schenker Group, and Sunstorm. He represented Bulgaria at the Eurovision Song Contest 2022 as the lead singer of Intelligent Music Project.

Life and career

Early life
Ronnie Romero was born in Santiago, Chile, in 1981. He has lived in Madrid, Spain, since 2009.

Lords of Black

In 2014, Romero, together with guitarist Tony Hernando, formerly of Spanish band Saratoga, founded the heavy metal band Lords of Black. Romero left the band in 2019 but returned in 2020.

Ritchie Blackmore's Rainbow

In 2015, Ritchie Blackmore announced his return to rock with a new lineup for his band Rainbow, with Ronnie Romero as the lead singer.

Other projects
CoreLeoni

In 2017, Leo Leoni and Hena Habegger of Swiss hard rock band Gotthard formed a side project titled CoreLeoni, with Romero, whom Leoni had met in 2014, joining on vocals. Romero left the project in 2020.

The Ferrymen

Also in 2017, Romero joined the supergroup The Ferrymen, which additionally includes Magnus Karlsson on guitar and Mike Terrana on drums. They released their self-titled debut album the same year. The trio released their sophomore album, A New Evil, in 2019.

Nozomu Wakai's Destinia

In 2018, Romero sang on the album Metal Souls by Nozomu Wakai's Destinia, a project launched by the Japanese guitarist in 2014.

Michael Schenker Group

In 2020, Michael Schenker announced that Romero would be participating in the upcoming MSG album Immortal, which is to be released in 2021.

Vandenberg

Also in 2020, Adrian Vandenberg recruited Romero to join his band Vandenberg in recording the album 2020.

Intelligent Music Project

Another new musical venture for Romero in the year 2020 was the Intelligent Music Project, an enterprise created by Bulgarian arts patron Milen Vrabevski in 2010. Romero appears on the album Life Motion.
In November 2021, Romero and the Intelligent Music Project were revealed as Bulgaria's entrant in the Eurovision Song Contest 2022, with the song "Intention".

Adrian Benegas

Romero will contribute vocals to the second studio album by Paraguayan heavy metal composer Adrian Benegas, to be released in 2023. The record is also set to feature input from German drummer Michael Ehré (Primal Fear, Gamma Ray), German producer Sascha Paeth (Avantasia, Kamelot), Tunisian bassist Anis Jouini (Myrath), and Dutch guitarist Timo Somers (Delain, Ayreon).

Band timeline
 Santelmo (2010–2011)
 Jose Rubio's Nova Era (2011–2013)
 Aria Inferno (2012–2013)
 Voces del Rock (2013–2014)
 Lords of Black (2014–2019, 2020–present)
 Ritchie Blackmore's Rainbow (2015–2019)
 Walter Giardino Temple (2017)
 The Ferrymen (2017–present)
 Nozomu Wakai's Destinia (2018)
 CoreLeoni (2018–2020)
 Vandenberg (2020–2021)
 Michael Schenker Group (2020–present)
 Intelligent Music Project (2020–present)
 Sunstorm (2020–present)
 Elegant Weapons (2022–present)

Discography

Guest appearances

References

External links
 

Chilean heavy metal singers

Eurovision Song Contest entrants of 2022
Rainbow (rock band) members
1981 births
Living people
Chilean expatriates in Spain